The Economic Survey of India 2011 or census of 2011 tells that the Indian economy in the year 2010-11 showed healthy growth and stable fiscal consolidation.

Economic Survey of India 2011
The global financial crisis of 2007–2008 initially caused a sluggish growth but emergence in the Indian economy was observed. The economy grew by an estimated 8.6 percent per the Central Statistics Office report of 7 February 2011. The growth was strong in the agricultural and manufacturing sectors. Inflation seemed to be high but came down from its initial position at the start of the fiscal year.

Challenges to the economy were identified during the survey: economic governance, efficiency of subsidies, and infrastructure. Policies are in place to tackle such problems.

Highlights of the survey
There has been a growth of 9.7 percent of the gross domestic product (GDP), at market price, in investments and savings and private consumption. The rise in the savings rate and the rate of investment was up to 33.7 percent and 36.5 percent, respectively, in the year 2009–2010.

According to the survey, the growth in the agricultural sector in the initial four years of the 11th year plan (2007–2012) was around 2.87 percent. In the year 2009–2010 the production of the food grains hiked to 232.1 billion tons from 218.1 billion tons.

In the year 2010–2011 the agricultural sector was expected to have a growth of 5.7 percent as the monsoon season was expected to be comparatively good. The rise in food inflation and the growing need of agricultural product in the country initiated the need of a second Green Revolution.

The industrial growth rate was 8.6 percent of the GDP at market price, whereas the manufacturing sector witnessed a growth of 9.1 percent in 2010–2011. Certain sectors like the telecom, crude oil production, and civil aviation have achieved well during the period of April through November; whereas there has been a low rate of growth in cement and fertilizer production, power generation, railway, and cargo sectors.

The economic survey of 2010–2011 showed that with rising investment, the role of infrastructure escalated. There was a huge growth in teledensity, which increased in urban areas from 20.74 percent in the year 2004 to 143.95 percent in the year 2010, and, in rural areas, 1.57 percent in the year 2004 to 30.18 percent in the year 2010. This showed that the telecommunication sector was performing well.

As far as the service sector was concerned, the survey suggested policies should be implemented to promote services like tourism, accounting, education, financial, and legal services.

The forex reserves was predicted to be $297.3 billion. According to the survey, in December 2010 exports would go up by 29.5 percent and imports would rise up by 19 percent.

The survey observed a rise in Internet banking which was estimated to be 59 percent which showed that the banking sector was performing effectively. Social program spending reportedly increased by five percent of the GDP.

According to the survey, the gross fiscal deficit went down by 1.5 percent—that is 4.8 percent from 6.3 percent in the year before.

Key economic indicators for 2010–11

Definition of key terms
AE GDP figures for 2010–11 are advance estimates
PE Provisional estimates
QE Quick estimates
NA Not available
a Final estimates
b Second advance estimates
c The annual growth rates have been recompiled from 2005–06 onward since the indices have been recompiled from April 4 onward using new series of WPI for the IIP items reported in value terms
d Average April through December 2010
e April through December 2010
f As of 31 December 2010
g Average exchange rate for 2010–11 (April through December 2010)
h Provisional
i Fiscal indicators for 2009 are based on the provisional actuals for 2009–10
j Indian rupee 1 Crore = Indian rupee 10 million = approximately USD 218,914 (conversion 1 USD = Rs 45.68)

Agriculture and food management

The growth of the agricultural sector plays an important part over the performance of the Indian economy.
 
After the quantum leap in agriculture due to 1960s Green Revolution, which also led to achievement of food security to a great extent, no such findings have been witnessed in India since then.

The rapid increasing demand for food security has established the demand for a second Green Revolution.

But it does not end there; further special attention to fruits, vegetables, pulses and oilseeds are a must to increase their production and productivity levels; the first Green Revolution did not pay any heed to these.

There has been an increase in the entire cropping area by 2.33 lakh hectares in the year 2010 as compared with the year 2009 in food grains, oilseeds, sugarcane and cotton. Whereas there is a decrease in the cropping area by 5.3 lakh hectors of the rice growing areas of West Bengal, Bihar and Uttar Pradesh due to drought during 2010. The same has been the case with the cropping areas under coarse cereals which decreased by 3.42 lakh hectors, but in the case of pulses the cropping area has gone up by 6.11 lakh hectors in 2010 which seems to be quite good. The total area under food grains has decreased by 2.71 lakh hectors. The cropping area for ground nuts has increased by 4 lakh hectares. The overall area in oilseeds has decreased by 8.27 lakh in 2010.

References

See also
Consensus Economics
Economic forecasting

2011 in India
Economy of India
Economic forecasting